The Luxembourg national baseball team is the national baseball team of Luxembourg. The team represents Luxembourg in international competitions of baseball.

baseball
National baseball teams in Europe